Igors Šiškins (born 9 June 1959 in Rēzekne) is a Latvian chimney sweep and ultra-nationalist and the former director of the Gustavs Celmiņš Centre. During the 1990s Šiškins was a member of the Latvian ultra-nationalist movement Pērkonkrusts. He was one of those convicted for bombing the Monument to the Liberators of Soviet Latvia and Riga from the German Fascist Invaders in June 1997.

Biography
Šiškins was born in Rēzekne to a Russian father and Latvian mother, but considers himself Latvian because his parents separated when he was young. In 1975 he graduated from the Professional Builders Technical High School No. 19. During the Soviet era Šiškins worked as a driver, locksmith, and stonecutter.

In the early 1990s Šiškins was involved in the ultra-nationalist Pērkonkrusts movement, which attempted to follow the principles of the pre-World War II movement. Šiškins was linked to the bombing of the Monument to the Liberators of Soviet Latvia and Riga from the German Fascist Invaders on 5–6 June 1997. The following year Šiškins sent a letter to the newspaper Diena saying that "as a member of the Latvian people, only ethnic nationalism is acceptable as opposed to the Latvian regime state nationalism...The will of the people is the will of God."

In January 1998 the Latvian Constitutional Protection Bureau began a search for Šiškins and other members of Pērkonkrusts, and Šiškins was arrested in April of that year. In 2000 he was sentenced to two years in prison, but along with other Pērkonkrusts members was released early, in 2001, after the Supreme Court of Latvia reduced the sentence as ordered by the Riga Regional Court. The activity of Pērkonkrusts was banned in 2006.

In the 2006 Latvian parliamentary elections Šiškins ran on the Homeland Union (also Fatherland Union, Tēvzemes savienība) ticket but the party received only 0.1% of the vote and he was not elected. In 2007, he founded the Gustavs Celmiņš Centre (GCC) association, intended to carry on the traditions of Pērkonkrusts. The group was dissolved by the Riga Regional Court in December 2014.

In 2010, Šiškins was one of the two people detained at a halted march commemorating the liberation of Riga from the Soviets on July 1, 1941, and the arrival of Nazi troops.

In 2012 Šiškins invited representatives from ultra-right movements in Ukraine, Russia, Germany and Poland to participate in the 16 March Remembrance Day of the Latvian Legionnaires. In October Šiškins was arrested, as police charged that he had attempted to purchase explosives.

References

1959 births
Living people
People from Rēzekne
Latvian people of Russian descent
Latvian anti-communists
Latvian independence activists
Latvian fascists
21st-century Latvian politicians